Scaphiodonichthys macracanthus is a species of cyprinid fish of the genus Scaphiodonichthys. It inhabits inland wetlands in Yunnan, China and Vietnam. It has been assessed as "data deficient" on the IUCN Red List. It is considered harmless to humans.

References

Cyprinidae
Cyprinid fish of Asia
Freshwater fish of China
Fish of Vietnam
IUCN Red List data deficient species